Marcelo Arévalo and Miguel Ángel Reyes-Varela were the defending champions but chose not to defend their title.

Alejandro Gómez and Thiago Agustín Tirante won the title after defeating Adrián Menéndez Maceiras and Mario Vilella Martínez 7–5, 6–7(5–7), [10–8] in the final.

Seeds

Draw

References

External links
 Main draw

Quito Challenger - Doubles
2021 Doubles